Technical Testing Center is acceptance testing facility that provides testing of new and existing military aircraft, military vehicles, military equipment, battle systems, civilian products for Serbian Armed Forces and is subordinated to the General Staff.

History
Technical Testing Center was founded by Yugoslav Federal Defence Secretariat on 22 March 1973 by uniting and transforming 7 military technical institutes of Yugoslav Ground Forces. In 2006 due to rationalization it was merged with Air Force Testing Center and Navy Testing Center into a single institution.

Missions
Technical Testing Center primary mission include quality control of military equipment as well as metrological securing of the defense system. It is obligated to research maximum weapons capabilities and to demonstrate possibilities of different usage and usage in extreme circumstances.

Center employs more than 150 engineers as well as highly-skilled pilots and drivers who are in charge of driving or flying prototypes tested. It has 25 laboratories and 2 testing polygons with about 2,000 measuring devices. It has more than 350 developed methods for testings and it is involved in making of more than 700 defense standards. 

Some of 7,000 tests conducted by the Center include:

Soko J-22 Orao attack aircraft (breaking sound barrier for first time in his history was done by center's pilot)
Soko G-4 Super Galeb light attack and jet trainer aircraft
Utva Lasta 95 trainer aircraft 
Nora B-52 self-propelled artillery system
Lazar armored personnel carrier
FAP 2026 off-road truck
Zastava NTV off-road vehicle
RADIAC SET AN/PDR 77 device for detection and measuring of nuclear radiation and radiation reconnaissance
SPP-1 underwater pistol new model M
ASM-DT amphibious rifle

Structure
Center consists of 5 departments and 3 testing centers:

Weapons department
Electronics department
Vehicle and River Flotilla Equipment department  
Air Force Equipment department 
Metrology department
Center for flight tests (Batajnica Air Base)
Center for testing weapons and equipment (Nikinci)
Center for examination of products

Testing Accidents

Since testing of new weaponry is always high risk mission there were accident during test procured by the Center with some of them having fatalities. During tests there are explosions, flights with new, never before tested and manned, aircraft types, dangerous tasks like testing new tanks passing rivers by diving, firing of new missile and many more risks. Some notable accidents include:

While testing of new weapons systems on Soko G-4 Super Galeb with serial number 23634 at Batajnica Air Base airport on 24 June 1987 pilot-captain Milan Pavlović died in crash and aircraft was destroyed
While manoeuvering on Soko G-4 Super Galeb (serial number 23736) at Batajnica Air Base on 24 September 2008, pilot-colonel Ištvan Kanaš died in a crash and the aircraft was damaged beyond repair
While testing new subsystems on Mig 21bis (serial number 17135) in 1991 the plane was destroyed, the pilot ejected and was not injured

External links
Video by Ministry of Defence (Serbia) department for public relations specialized military establishment Media Center "Odbrana" about TTC with presentation of their history and today work published for partying TTC military institute day of foundation
 https://www.youtube.com/watch?v=hZ3yPN-PrXs
Video about being test flight pilot. At 1.50 minutes you will see Soko J-22 Orao flying only 6 meters above ground. TTC pilots are considered best and elite in Serbia and all are chosen from Serbian Air Force for the difficult task of testing airplanes. Pilots from TTC are flying in many airshows representing TTC and Serbian Defense Ministry around the world. 
 https://www.youtube.com/watch?v=9t74A7tjfdg
Video of Soko J-22 Orao flying only few meter above ground
 https://www.youtube.com/watch?v=p4twcfUeJT8
This two videos are about "Flying star" acrobatic group of TTC pilots with special modified Soko G-4 Super Galeb planes recorded in June 1998 before 1999 when planes were destroyed in bombardment. 
 https://www.youtube.com/watch?v=AMROG8V2s0k
 https://www.youtube.com/watch?v=8aAKL90DnRU#!
Video of testing Lasta 95 by TTC pilot and TTC experts in the ground station monitoring parameters of plane in test 
 https://www.youtube.com/watch?v=nFzciNdUgws
New military car developed by VTI - Military Technical Institute Belgrade and Zastava tested by TTC driver
 https://www.youtube.com/watch?v=zbwlJrGNDRo

References

Ministry of Defence (Serbia)
Defense industry of Serbia